The Austin A90 Atlantic is a British car produced by the Austin Motor Company from 1949 until 1952. It was launched initially as a four-seat convertible, making its début at the 1948 Earls Court Motor Show in London, with production models built between early 1949 and late 1950. A two-door coupé, marketed as the A90 Atlantic sports saloon, followed a year later. It had been previewed at the 1949 Motor Show and was in production at Longbridge between 1950 and 1952.

Development
The Atlantic was one of the first post-war cars engineered from scratch by Austin, and was said to be styled from a thumbnail sketch by Leonard Lord, chairman of Austin and later the British Motor Corporation (BMC) — though the styling was more likely the work of resident Argentine Austin stylist Dick Burzi. The car was almost certainly influenced by a 1946 Pininfarina-bodied Alfa Romeo cabriolet, which just happened to end up at the Longbridge factory in mid-1947, a few months before the light blue 16 hp sports prototype made its first appearance in the experimental department and on nearby roads around the factory. A rare edition was a coachbuilt estate car, regularly seen in the 1950s used by a convent in Leith, Scotland. The car had a lifting rear door, and sported unusual curved perspex roof panels.

With the government edict of "export or die", and steel allocated only to those who generated much needed revenue, the Atlantic was designed specifically to appeal to North American tastes.  The car featured up-to-the-minute detailing, with a wrap around windscreen, composed of a flat glass centre section with tiny curved end panels. The front wings (fenders) sported twin "flying A" hood ornaments and swept down to a rounded tail, with spats enclosing the rear wheels. A centrally mounted third, main beam, headlight was built into the letter-box style air intake grille, and the then unheard of luxury of hydraulically powered windows and hood (convertible top), "flashing indicators" (blinkers) rather than trafficators, (for the United States market at least) and the option of EKCO or HMV Autocrat radios.  The range-topping Austin was offered in a variety of "jewelescent" colours with names like "seafoam green" and "desert gold", but few of these new metallics were sold in the UK market. The convertible, a three window, drophead coupe, had a simple fabric top, without rear quarter lights (opera windows), which butted up to the rear of a rather thick windscreen header rail. The fixed head, five window, sports saloon (hardtop), could be had with its roof painted or covered in fabric. This gave it the popular "drophead", or "cabriolet", look; all the style with no leaks. As its final trick, the centre section of the three piece, wrap-around, rear window could be lowered into the boot (trunk), for added ventilation by a remote winder above the front windscreen. Few people in the car's native Britain would have ever seen anything like the futuristically-styled Atlantic before, and certainly not from a conservative mainstream manufacturer like Austin. The radical Atlantic suffered, however, from the dramatically new Jaguar XK120, also launched at the 1948 Motor Show.

Exports
Out of a total production run of 7,981, 3,597 were exported, 350 of which were to the US. This low level of sales in the US was despite a huge focus by Austin, including a successful attempt at breaking 63 stock car records at the Indianapolis Motor Speedway in April 1949 by Alan Hess, Charles Goodacre and Dennis Buckley) and a US$1000 price reduction in 1949. The four-cylinder 2.7-litre engine could not compare in power output to native V8 engines — although, for its time, performance was strong. A few A90 engines were also used in civilian versions of the Austin Champ.

The car did see more success in former British Colonies, Europe, Scandinavia and Australasia.

Performance
The large four-cylinder produced  @ 4000rpm and later saw service in the Austin-Healey 100.

The test car, which had the optional hydraulically powered top and window operation (£40 extra), cost £824, including taxes.

The handling was average, but adequate for the era, with coil independent suspension at the front and leaf springs at the rear, employing lever arm shock absorbers or 'dampers' which, when worn, resulted in a characteristic 'wave motion' over undulating surfaces. The underpinnings were somewhat less exotic than the all-enveloping bodywork: the chassis and running gear were based on that of the well-proven 1949 Austin A70 Hampshire saloon (not to be confused with the smaller entry level A40 Devon). Brakes were initially a mix of hydraulic (front) and mechanical (rear) with  drums, replaced by a fully hydraulic brake setup from 1951 onwards on the hardtop coupe (saloon) with large diameter finned drums and vented wheels. This made for efficient anti-fade braking for the time, necessary to bring the  vehicle to rest.

Longevity
The lack of factory rust proofing and styling that produced a multitude of mud traps led to rapid corrosion commonplace among many rushed post-war British designs. As a consequence of this and many Atlantics being broken up to provide spares for the Austin-Healey 100 very few examples survived into the 1970s, let alone the next century.  In the UK today, it is estimated that fewer than 60 survive, half of them roadworthy.

References

External links

 Austin Counties Car Club
 Austin A90 Atlantic at Austin Memories
 Article on A90 Atlantic at Motorbase 
 An A90-based one-off by Jensen

Atlantic
Cars introduced in 1949
1950s cars
Convertibles
Coupés